Jessie Trout (July 26, 1895 – 1990) was a Canadian missionary to Japan for nearly 20 years until she left Japan during World War II. She was a leader in the Disciples of Christ (Campbell Movement) and the first woman to serve as vice president of the United Christian Missionary Society. She was a member of the Disciples of Christ, an author, translator, and co-founder of the Christian Women's Fellowship (1950) and the International Christian Women's Fellowship (1953).

She received an honorary doctor of divinity degree from Bethany College in 1955.

Early life

Jessie Mary Trout was born to Archibald Trout on July 26, 1895 at Owen Sound off of Georgian Bay in Ontario, Canada. She graduated from Owen Sound Collegiate Institute and studied at the teachers college, Toronto Normal School. She was a school teacher, when she traveled to Indianapolis in 1920. She also studied at The College of Missions in Indianapolis, which trained missionaries in the Campbell Movement. The school was founded by the Christian Woman's Board of Missions.

Career

Japan
Inspired by a church member, Trout served as a missionary in Japan for the American Presbyterian Board from 1921 to 1940, spending the first two years learning Japanese. The she served women and girls in Akita. She taught at the Margaret K. Long for Girls (Japanese: Joshi Se Gakun, meaning Girl’s Holy School) in Tokyo beginning in 1931.  She worked from 1935 to 1940 in an ecumenical program in Kagawa, under Toyohiko Kagawa. She entertained notable people and translated his works. She took a leave in 1940 and due to increased nationalism was unable to return to Japan, losing her belongings, including an extensive print collection.

While in Japan, she met and mentored Itoko Maeda, a young girl attending the Christian school. Trout aided Maeda in getting scholarships to continue her Christian education, both in Japan and the United States. Itoko Maeda would later go on to become an important missionary in her own right.

Japanese-American internment camps
During World War II, Trout left Japan and returned to the United States. She was one of the church leaders who visited Japanese Internment camps during World War II to conduct "mass meetings, seminars, open forums, ministers' conferences, [and] Bible study sessions," serving the Emergency Million Movement as Associate Director. The Disciples of Christ was outspoken in its opposition to the internment of Japanese Americans and as Conner writes, "[It] took a leading role in a well-coordinated, national public and private effort to move Japanese Americans out of internment camps and resettle them in towns and cities across the nation’s heartland." Trout, as a Disciples missionary, aided in this effort by touring rural Indiana communities to determine the availability of employment for, and sentiments towards, the internees.

Leadership
In the 1940s, she was the national security of the magazine of the United Christian Missionary Society, World Call. In January 1946, she became the executive secretary of the department of missionary education, with 40 secretaries and a field staff, and working with 5,000 organizations throughout the United States. From 1950 to 1961, she was vice president of the United Christian Missionary Society in Indianapolis;  The first woman to assume that position. Trout worked for the Division of World Missions as a field liaison. Over her career, she traveled to 35 countries, some of which were during revolutionary control. She was a leader in the Disciples of Christ (Campbell Movement) of Thomas and Alexander Campbell.

Trout helped co-found the Christian Women's Fellowship in 1950 and served as chief executive of the Christian Women's Fellowship. Throughout United States and Canada, there were about 250,000 members in more than 4,200 groups. This was a significant effort to organize efforts of women and make their efforts more meaningful during a  conservative period when women's leadership roles within the Christian Church was limited. It merged local women's guilds and missionary organizations. She founded the International Christian Women's Fellowship (1953). Trout also helped establish women's groups in Britain and visited women's groups in Thailand, Germany, Japan, the Philippines, Britain, and Pakistan.

Later years
She returned to missionary work in Japan 1961 and retired in 1963, intending to continue her efforts as a translator and a speaker and living in Indianapolis in the winter and Owen Sound in the summer.

Works 
 Kagawa, Toyohiko (author); Jessie M. Trout (translator); Kiyozumi Ozawa (translator). (circa 1936)  Christian Brotherhood and Economic Reconstruction. London: Student Christian Movement Press.
 
 Trout, Jessie M. (1942). Forward in Missions and Education: Disciples of Christ help build the Kingdom; a study course for adults and young people. United Christian Missionary Society.
 Trout, Jessie M. (1953). Where We Have Served. Indianapolis: United Christian Missionary Society.
 Trout, Jessie. (1954). Like a Watered Garden. Bethany Press.
 Kagawa, Toyohiko; Wright, Rose; Trout, Jessie (translator). (1956). Pine, bamboo, and plum.
 Trout, Jessie. (1957). Bertha Fidelia Her Story. Bethany Press.
 Kagawa, Toyohiko; Trout, Jessie M. (1960). Kagawa, Japanese prophet: His witness in life and word. New York: Association Press. WorldCat Link

References

Further reading
 
 

1895 births
1990 deaths
Canadian Presbyterian missionaries
Christian Church (Disciples of Christ) missionaries
Female Christian missionaries
Restoration Movement
Presbyterian missionaries in Japan